Edson Elcock (born January 10, 1985 in Brooklyn, New York) is an American soccer player.

Career

College and Amateur
Elcock attended Brooklyn Friends School, where he set the record for most goals in a season. He was also on the 2003 Brooklyn Friends basketball team which won the NYS State Championship. He played college soccer at NCAA Division II Wingate University in 2003 where he was the South Atlantic Conference Freshman of the Year. Following the 2003 season, he transferred to Old Dominion University, where he was a 2006 first team All American. In 2006, he helped lead ODU to its fifth straight NCAA tournament appearance as the Monarchs advanced for the first time to the round of 16. Elcock was also honored by the Norfolk Sports Club with the Tom Scott award which is presented to ODU's top senior student athlete.

During his college years Elcock also played for the Brooklyn Knights and the Virginia Beach Submariners in USL Premier Development League.

Professional
Elcock was drafted in the 3rd round (29th overall) in the 2007 MLS SuperDraft by the Kansas City Wizards and signed a developmental contract. He saw no first team games, only playing eight reserve team games, before being waived at the end of the season.

In 2008, Elcock signed with the Puerto Rico Islanders of the USL First Division. After playing only 9 games and scoring 2 goals for the squad, Edson resigned to continue his education.

Elcock returned to professional soccer in 2009 when he signed with the Richmond Kickers in the USL Second Division, and helped the Kickers to the 2009 USL Second Division championship. On January 14, 2010 Richmond announced the re-signing of Elcock for the 2010 season. Elcock re-signed for the 2011 season on January 5, 2011.

He returned to Richmond again for the 2012 season, agreeing terms on January 5, 2012.

Honors

Richmond Kickers
USL Second Division Champions (1): 2009

References

External links
Richmond Kickers bio
Puerto Rico Islanders bio

1985 births
Living people
Sportspeople from Brooklyn
Soccer players from New York City
American soccer players
USL First Division players
USL Second Division players
USL League Two players
USL Championship players
Expatriate footballers in Puerto Rico
Old Dominion Monarchs men's soccer players
Brooklyn Knights players
Virginia Beach Piranhas players
Sporting Kansas City players
Puerto Rico Islanders players
Richmond Kickers players
Sporting Kansas City draft picks
All-American men's college soccer players
Association football midfielders
Brooklyn Friends School alumni